Susan Frances Harmar Nicholls (born 23 November 1943) is an English actress, known for her roles on British television in Crossroads (1964–1968), The Fall and Rise of Reginald Perrin (1976–1979) and, Rentaghost (1981–1984), and especially for her long-running part as Audrey Roberts in the soap opera Coronation Street (1979–1982, 1984–present). She also appeared on Broadway in the 1974 revival of the comedy London Assurance.

Nicholls first appeared as Audrey in Coronation Street in 1979 and played the role intermittently for six years, before joining the cast permanently in 1985. She won the 2000 British Soap Award for Best Comedy Performance and the 2003 British Soap Award for Best Dramatic Performance, and received the Outstanding Achievement Award in 2019.

Early life
Susan Frances Harmar Nicholls was born in Darlaston, Wednesbury. She was educated at the School of St Mary and St Anne (now known as Abbots Bromley School for Girls), and is a graduate of the Royal Academy of Dramatic Art.

Career
Nicholls first became known as Marilyn Gates on Crossroads, a role she played from 1964 to 1968. A song she first sang on the programme, "Where Will You Be?", charted on 3 July 1968, eventually reaching number 17 in the UK Singles Chart.

Nicholls's second single was less successful and she embarked on a career in a cabaret, performing her solo act all over the country. She returned to the stage in a variety of popular plays and pantomimes. During the 1970s, she had two very different stints abroad. In Vienna she sang between strip acts at a nightclub while in 1974 she toured America and Canada with the Royal Shakespeare Company in London Assurance, finishing with a six-week run on Broadway.

She played the role of the secretary, Joan Greengross (later Webster and Millbeck) in the sitcom The Fall and Rise of Reginald Perrin (1976–1979) and its sequel The Legacy of Reginald Perrin (1996), as well as Nadia Popov in Rentaghost and Mrs Muddle in Pipkins (1973) and appeared as Derinda Forbes in the hard-hitting police drama The Professionals; episode "The Acorn Syndrome" (1980).

She has played Audrey in Coronation Street as an occasional visitor since April 1979, and a full-time permanent character since 1985.

Personal life
Nicholls' father was Sir Harmar Nicholls, later Lord Harmar-Nicholls, the former Conservative MP for Peterborough (1950–1974) and MEP for Greater Manchester South (1979–1984), and subsequently a life peer; she is thus entitled to be addressed as "The Honourable Susan Nicholls". Nicholls was married to Mark Eden from 1993 until his death in 2021; Eden appeared as Alan Bradley on Coronation Street from 1986 until 1989.

In 2011, while watching an episode of Coronation Street, Sister Anna Bianconi-Moore, a Senior nurse at the dermatology department at Addenbrooke's Hospital in Cambridge, noticed a mole on Nicholls' shoulder. The nurse contacted the show immediately via email to express her concerns. Nicholls was seen by Zeena Islam – Coronation Street's in-house doctor, who referred her to a skin cancer specialist, where she was diagnosed with malignant melanoma. After the mole was surgically removed, ITV contacted Bianconi-Moore to inform her of the situation and she was invited to the Coronation Street set to meet Nicholls.

Awards and nominations

References

External links

Sue Nicholls at the British Film Institute
Sue Nicholls (Aveleyman)

1943 births
Living people
English television actresses
English soap opera actresses
People from Walsall
Daughters of life peers
Alumni of RADA
People educated at Abbots Bromley School for Girls
Conservative Party (UK) people